Bardot is an upcoming French drama television series about the actress and model Brigitte Bardot. It is created and directed by Danièle Thompson and Christopher Thompson, and stars the newcomer Julia de Nunez in the title role. The six 52-minute episodes will be broadcast on France 2 in 2023.

Plot
The serial follows the career of the actress and model Brigitte Bardot, from her first casting at age 15 until the filming of Henri-Georges Clouzot's film La Vérité (1960) ten years later.

Cast
 Julia de Nunez as Brigitte Bardot
 Victor Belmondo as Roger Vadim
 Jules Benchetrit as Sami Frey
 Géraldine Pailhas as Anne-Marie Mucel, Brigitte Bardot's mother
 Hippolyte Girardot as Louis Bardot, Brigitte Bardot's father
 Yvan Attal as Raoul Lévy
 Anne Le Ny as Olga Horstig
 Louis-Do de Lencquesaing as Henri-Georges Clouzot
 Laurent Stocker as Pierre Lazareff
 Oscar Lesage as Jacques Charrier
 Noham Edje as Jean-Louis Trintignant
 Fabian Wolfrom as Sacha Distel
 Mikaël Mittelstadt as Gilbert Bécaud

Production
Bardot was created, written and directed by Danièle Thompson and Christopher Thompson. It was produced by Pascal Breton and Judith Rochelois for Federation and co-produced by GFilms. Principal photography took place in Saint-Tropez from 11 April to 6 May 2022 and continued in the Paris region until 13 June.

The identity of the lead actress, the newcomer Julia de Nunez, was kept secret until the end of May 2022. The first picture of her in the role of Bardot was released on 13 June 2022.

References

External links
 

Upcoming drama television series
2020s French television miniseries
2020s French drama television series
Biographical television series
Cultural depictions of Brigitte Bardot
Henri-Georges Clouzot
France Télévisions television dramas
French-language television shows
Television series about actors
Television series set in the 1950s